John Andrew Chandler (21 November 1907 – 1969) was a South African athlete who competed in the 1930 British Empire Games.

At the 1930 Empire Games he won the bronze medal with the South African relay in the 4×440 yards competition. In the 880 yards contest he finished fourth.

External links
Profile at trackfield.brinkster.net
John Chandler's genealogical profile

1907 births
1969 deaths
South African male sprinters
Athletes (track and field) at the 1930 British Empire Games
Commonwealth Games bronze medallists for South Africa
Commonwealth Games medallists in athletics
Medallists at the 1930 British Empire Games